Pusiola danella is a moth in the subfamily Arctiinae. It was described by Antonio Durante and Sandro Panzera in 2002. It is found in Nigeria.

References

Moths described in 2002
Lithosiini
Moths of Africa